So You Think You Can Dance, an American dance competition show,  returned for its eleventh season on Wednesday, May 28, 2014. The commission of an eleventh season was first announced by series creator Nigel Lythgoe on the September 10, 2013, telecast of the season 10 finale. The season again features Lythgoe, who also serves as executive producer, and ballroom expert Mary Murphy as the two permanent members of the judge's panel while Cat Deeley continues in her role as host for a tenth consecutive season.

Contemporary dancer Ricky Ubeda won the competition, and his prizes include $250,000, the chance to appear on the cover of Dance Spirit magazine, the offer  of a role in the 2014 Broadway revival of the musical On the Town as choreographed by one of this season's guest choreographers, Joshua Bergasse, and the title of America's Favorite Dancer. The runner-up was tap dancer Valerie Rockey. This season saw the show eliminate interactive viewer participation by telephone, with producers preferring to divert weekly voting to the show's website and the network's new proprietary smartphone app, a process that reduced the overall number of votes each participating viewer could cast each week.

Auditions

Open auditions for season 11 were held in five cities beginning on Jan 13.

Callbacks
In a change from the procedure of the previous nine seasons, in which post-open-audition callbacks were held in Las Vegas and referenced collectively as "Vegas Week", season 11's callbacks were held in Los Angeles, with no special nomenclature. A total of 157 dancers began the week by performing a solo; those contestants not cut at this point went on to learn and perform various styles of choreography with cuts being made after every round. At the end of the final round of the week, 44 dancers remained, from which the judges selected a Top 20 to proceed into the performance show stage of the competition.

Finals

Top 20 Contestants
As with most previous seasons of So You Think You Can Dance, ten female contestants and ten male contestants were selected at the end of the callbacks week to proceed into the performance show stage of the competition.

Female Contestants

Male Contestants

Elimination chart

Performances
In contrast with previous seasons, the top 20 showcase, in which all the dancers performed in their own styles, was a competitive and special episode.

Meet the Top 20 (July 2, 2014)
 Judges: Nigel Lythgoe, Mary Murphy, Jason Derulo
Guest Performance: Jason Derulo and Snoop Dogg —"Wiggle"
 Performances:

Top 20 (July 9, 2014)
Group Dance: "New York, New York" from On the Town (Broadway; Choreographer: Joshua Bergasse)
Judges: Nigel Lythgoe, Mary Murphy, Misty Copeland
 Performances:

Top 18 (July 16, 2014)
Group Dance: "How It's Done"—District 78 (Hip-hop; Choreographers: Christopher "Pharside" Jennings and Krystal "Phoenix" Meraz)
Judges: Nigel Lythgoe, Mary Murphy, Misty Copeland
Guest Performance: A Great Big World - Say Something
 Performances:

Top 16 (July 23, 2014)
Group Dance: "Take Me to the River"—Annie Lenox (Jazz; Choreographer: Mandy Moore)
Judges: Nigel Lythgoe, Mary Murphy, Misty Copeland
Guest Performance: Lucy Hale—"Lie a Little Better"

Top 14 (July 30, 2014)
Group Dance: "Last Moment"—Christophe Filippi (Contemporary; Choreographer: Stacey Tookey)
Judges: Nigel Lythgoe, Mary Murphy, Christina Applegate

Solos:

Top 10 (August 6, 2014)
Group Dance: "Bang Bang"—Jessie J, Ariana Grande and Nicki Minaj (Hip-hop; Choreographer: Jamal Sims)
Judges: Nigel Lythgoe, Mary Murphy, Tara Lipinski
Guest Performance: Christina Perri—"Burning Gold"

Top 8 (August 13, 2014)
Group Dance: "A Place With No Name"—Michael Jackson (Hip-hop; Choreographer: Travis Payne)
Judges: Nigel Lythgoe, Mary Murphy, Jenna Dewan Tatum

Solos:

Top 6 (August 20, 2014)
Group Dance: "Hide (Tropkillaz Remix)"—N.A.S.A feat. Aynzil Jones (Hip-hop; Choreographer: Nick Demoura)
Judges: Nigel Lythgoe, Mary Murphy, Christina Applegate
Guest Performance: Rixton — "Me and My Broken Heart"

Solos:

Top 4 (August 27, 2014)
Group Dance: "Wind Beneath My Wings"—RyanDan (Contemporary; Choreographer: Travis Wall)
Judges: Nigel Lythgoe, Mary Murphy, Jesse Tyler Ferguson
Guest Performance: Jason Mraz—"Love Someone"

Solos:

Week 10 (Finale) (September 3, 2014)
Judges: Nigel Lythgoe, Mary Murphy, Debbie Allen, Adam Shankman, Jenna Dewan-Tatum, Tara Lipinski
 Guest Music Performance: Enrique Iglesias and Sean Paul - "Bailando"
Group dances & guest performers:

 Michael Dameski is the winner of So You Think You Can Dance Australia's fourth season.

Judges & finalists' picks

All-Stars Dance Pool

 This dancer was eliminated this week.
 This dancer was in the bottom 4 this week.
 This dancer placed second in the competition.
 This dancer won the competition.

Ratings

U.S. Nielsen ratings

See also
 List of So You Think You Can Dance finalists

References

2014 American television seasons
Season 11